The 1932 Kent State Golden Flashes football team was an American football team that represented Kent State College (later renamed Kent State University) in the Ohio Athletic Conference (OAC) during the 1932 college football season. In its eighth and final season under head coach Merle E. Wagoner, Kent State compiled a 0–5–2 record.

Schedule

References

Kent State
Kent State Golden Flashes football seasons
Kent State Golden Flashes football